The UEFA Men's Coach of the Year Award is an association football award given to the manager coaching a men's football club in Europe that is considered the best in the previous season of both club and national team competition. The award, created in 2020 by UEFA in partnership with European Sports Media (ESM) group, replaced the European Football Coach of the Season award that was awarded by UEFA and the Association of European Journalists, and later the European Union of Sports Press, from 1978 to 2016.

Criteria
According to UEFA, for this award, "coaches in Europe, irrespective of nationality, [are] judged in regard to their performances over the whole season in all competitions – both domestically and internationally – at either club, or national team level."

Voting
80 coaches, from the clubs that participated in the group stages of that year's UEFA Champions League and UEFA Europa League, along with 55 sports journalists selected by the European Sports Media group representing each of the UEFA national associations, provide a list of their three best-ranked coaches from one to three, with the first player receiving five points, the second three points and the third one point. Coaches are not allowed to vote for themselves. The three coaches with the most points overall are shortlisted, and the winner is announced during the group stage draw of the next season's UEFA Champions League.

Award history

Winners

Finalists

2019–20

2020–21

2021–22

See also
 European Football Coach of the Season
 UEFA Women's Coach of the Year Award
 UEFA Club Football Awards
 The Best FIFA Football Coach

References

Coach
European football trophies and awards